The Ipswich Motorway (M7) is a major road that connects Brisbane and Ipswich in South East Queensland, Australia. It commences at the junction of Ipswich Road and Granard Road and proceeds through to the M2 Logan Motorway interchange. It is then signed M2 until the junction of the Warrego Highway and the Cunningham Highway 

It initially passes through the suburbs of Rocklea, Oxley and Darra in south west Brisbane before reaching the eastern suburbs of Ipswich such as Redbank Plains, Goodna and Riverview.  The Motorway is directly connected to the M5 Centenary Motorway at Darra and the M2 Logan Motorway at Gailes. In 2008, it was estimated that 80,000 cars use the road daily. In late 2010, this figure had risen to close to 100,000 vehicles per day. In 2002, the morning peak traffic volume was greatest between 7:00 am and 8:00 am. By 2008, the morning peak traffic volume peaked between the hours of 5:00 am and 6:00 am.

The motorway was formed from the original Ipswich Road/Cunningham Arterial Road, which was upgraded during the 1980s and 1990s to form a grade-separated motorway-grade route. The Ipswich Motorway was commissioned on 17 May 1994.

This road consists of two separate state-controlled roads as defined by the Department of Transport and Main Roads (TMR). The part from Rocklea to Goodna is named Cunningham Arterial Road (number U16) and the other is named as part of the Cunningham Highway (number 17A). Road U16 is part of the state strategic network, and road 17A is part of the national network.

Upgrade
In 2003, planning for an upgrade of the entire road began. The road was identified in the South East Queensland Infrastructure Plan and Program as one requiring urgent attention.  An upgrade was needed to improve safety and relieve traffic congestion.

With the Federal Government funding provided, the upgrades were completed from the Centenary Motorway interchange to the Logan Motorway interchange.

The upgrade from four lanes to six between Wacol and Darra was one of the Australian Labor Party's key 2007 federal election promises. The upgrade included widening the Ipswich Motorway from four to six lanes, transformation of the Centenary Highway Interchange to a free-flowing multi level system interchange and  work on adjoining service roads that aims to reduce traffic on the motorway by up to 20%.  The Federal government has contributed a total of $3.1 billion for the upgrade. The Wacol to Darra section of the motorway was officially opened on 18 April 2010.

The eight kilometres upgrade of the Ipswich Motorway between Dinmore and Goodna started in mid-2009.  It was completed in 2012 and officially opened on 15 May 2012. The A$1.95 billion project funded by the Australian Government is delivered by the Origin Alliance consisting of the Department of Transport & Main Roads, Abigroup, Seymour Whyte, Fulton Hogan, SMEC and Parsons Brinckerhoff.

The final section to be upgraded is a  stretch between Darra and Rocklea with its planning finalised in 2011. Stage 1 of the Ipswich Motorway upgrade, the 3km section between Granard Road, Rocklea and Oxley Road, Oxley, has commenced in 2017. Construction works are scheduled for completion in late 2020. This work was completed in April 2021 at a cost of $400 million.

The proposed Goodna Bypass or Northern Bypass of the western section of the M2 was cancelled following the 2007 elections. This  section of new Motorway would have taken traffic from the Warrego and Cunningham Highways to the Logan Motorway interchange including four crossings of the Brisbane River.

Interchanges

See also

 Freeways in Australia
 Freeways in Brisbane
 Road transport in Brisbane

References

Highways in Queensland
Roads in Brisbane
South East Queensland
Transport infrastructure completed in 1994
1994 establishments in Australia